Flattop Island is one of several uninhabited Canadian arctic islands in Kivalliq Region, Nunavut, Canada. It is located within western Hudson Bay,  from the community of Whale Cove.

Other islands in the vicinity include Airartuuq Island, Bibby Island, Imiligaarjuk Island, Imilijjuaq Island, Irik Island, Ivuniraarjuq Island, Kayak Island, and Walrus Island.

References

Islands of Hudson Bay
Uninhabited islands of Kivalliq Region